Cornice Channel is a narrow channel separating Galindez Island from the eastern part of Skua Island in the Argentine Islands of the Wilhelm Archipelago. It was first surveyed in 1935–36 by the British Graham Land Expedition under John Rymill, and so named in 1954 by the UK Antarctic Place-Names Committee because a prominent cornice overhangs the ice cliff on the Galindez Island side of the channel.

References
 

Straits of the Wilhelm Archipelago